William Nicholaus Lyimo (born 11 April 1993), popularly known by his stage name Bill Nass, is a Tanzanian rapper of Chagga heritage, he was born in Tanga, Tanga Region. MTV Base named him among the "50 Artists To Watch For In 2017". He is currently based in Dar es Salaam. Months after the release of his debut single "Raha", Lyimo was nominated on 2015's Kilimanjaro Tanzania Music Awards (KTMA) as a "New Best Artist".

Early life and education 
William Nicholaus Lyimo was born on 11 April 1993, at Bombo Hospital in Tanga Tanzania to Chagga parents from Kilimanjaro Region.

Bill Nass started his primary education at Mbuyuni Primary School in Tanga 2000 – 2003 then moved to Mkunguni Primary School in Kinondoni Dar es Salaam. He Later joined Oysterbay Secondary School in 2007 to 2010 where he graduated his secondary studies. From 2011 to 2013, he studied for a diploma in Procurement and supplies management at the College Of Business Education Dar es Salaam Campus. In 2014 he rejoined the college until 2017 where he graduated with a Bachelor's degree in Procurement and supplies Management

Career 
MTV Base named him as one of the "Best 50 Artists to Watch For In 2017". Later In 2017, Nass made his debut on Coke Studio Africa as a Big Breakthrough Artist, performed alongside Uganda's Sheeba and Ethiopia's Asgegenew.

Lyimo has performed several times on Fiesta, a concert that has been managed by Clouds Fm Radio for years. Also in 2019, he performed on Wasafi Festival's stage.

Through his Instagram page, Bill Nass shared the advent of "Love Tour" with his fiancée Nandy who have two songs together "Bugana" and "Do Me". 

As of December 2022, Bill Nass has approximately six million followers on his digital platforms.

Endorsements 

 2016 He became PamojaApp brand ambassador

Personal life 
In 2018, Lyimo and his wife Nandy, were briefly detained by the Tanzanian authorities for sharing what they considered as being indecent online content.

Bill Nass proposed to Nandy early in 2020 on a live TV show.

Bill Nass and Nandy got married in July 2022. The two are blessed with one daughter.

Discography

References 

1993 births
Living people
Tanzanian rappers
People from Dar es Salaam
People from Kilimanjaro Region
Tanzanian Christians
Tanzanian hip hop musicians
21st-century Tanzanian male singers
Tanzanian Bongo Flava musicians